Larrini is a tribe of square-headed wasps in the family Crabronidae. About 15 genera and more than 1,300 described species are placed in the Larrini.

Genera
These 15 genera belong to the tribe Larrini:

 Dalara Ritsema, 1884
 Dicranorhina Shuckard, 1840
 Gastrosericus Spinola, 1839
 Holotachysphex de Beaumont, 1940
 Kohliella Brauns, 1910
 Larra Fabricius, 1793 (mole cricket hunters)
 Larropsis Patton, 1892
 Liris Fabricius, 1804
 Megalara Kimsey and Ohl, 2012
 Paraliris Kohl, 1884
 Parapiagetia Kohl, 1897
 Prosopigastra A. Costa, 1867
 Tachysphex Kohl, 1883
 Tachytella Brauns, 1906
 Tachytes Panzer, 1806

References

External links

 

Crabronidae